is a Japanese water polo player. She was selected to the Japan women's national water polo team, for the 2020 Summer Olympics.

She participated at the 2019 World Aquatics Championships, and 2019 FINA Women's Water Polo World League.

References

External links 
 KOIDE Miku (JPN) Gwangju South Korea 14/07/2019 Waterpolo
 Miku Koide #6 of Japan looks to pass against Giulia Emmolo #9 of Italy

1992 births
Living people
Japanese female water polo players
Water polo players at the 2020 Summer Olympics
Olympic water polo players of Japan
21st-century Japanese women